Anton Sergeyevich Samoylov (born 15 November 1983) is a former Russian professional football player.

Club career
He made his Russian Football National League debut for FC Dynamo Makhachkala on 26 March 2006 in a game against FC Mashuk-KMV Pyatigorsk.

External links
 

1983 births
Living people
Russian footballers
Association football defenders
FC Izhevsk players
FC Zenit-Izhevsk players
FC Dynamo Makhachkala players